Christopher Mark Bebb Williams (born 11 January 1955) is an English former first-class cricketer.

Williams was born at Stamford Hill in January 1955. While studying at the University of Cambridge, he made a single appearance in first-class cricket for Cambridge University against Warwickshire at Fenner's in 1976. Batting twice in the match, he was dismissed in the Cambridge first-innings for 2 runs by Stephen Perryman, while in their second-innings he was dismissed by Peter Lewington for 29 runs. In addition to playing first-class cricket, Williams also played minor counties cricket for Shropshire in 1981 and 1982, making three appearances in the Minor Counties Championship, before returning to make a single appearance for Shropshire in the 1986 MCCA Knockout Trophy. After graduating from Cambridge, he became a schoolteacher.

References

External links

1955 births
Living people
People from Stamford Hill
Schoolteachers from London
Alumni of the University of Cambridge
English cricketers
Cambridge University cricketers
Shropshire cricketers